Van Metre is an unincorporated community in Jones County, in the U.S. state of South Dakota.

History
Van Metre was originally Bovine; the present name is in honor of Arthur C. Van Metre, a South Dakota pioneer. A post office called Bovine was established in 1891, the name was changed to Van Metre in 1907, and the post office closed in 1960.

References

Unincorporated communities in Jones County, South Dakota
Unincorporated communities in South Dakota